Francis Burton was an Irish politician.

Burton was born in County Cork and educated at Eton and Trinity College, Dublin.

Burgh represented  Ennis from 1692 until his death in 1714.

References

People from County Cork
1763 deaths
Irish MPs 1692–1693
Irish MPs 1695–1699
Irish MPs 1703–1713
Irish MPs 1713–1714
Members of the Parliament of Ireland (pre-1801) for County Clare constituencies
Alumni of Trinity College Dublin
People educated at Eton College